When a work's copyright expires, it enters the public domain. The following is a list of works that enter the public domain in 2025. Since laws vary globally, the copyright status of some works are not uniform.

Entering the public domain in countries with life + 70 years

With the exception of Belarus (Life + 50 years) and Spain (which has a copyright term of Life + 80 years for creators that died before 1987), a work enters the public domain in Europe 70 years after the creator's death, if it was published during the creator's lifetime. For previously unpublished material, those who publish it first will have the publication rights for 25 years. The list is sorted alphabetically and includes a notable work of the creator that entered the public domain on 1 January 2025.

Entering the public domain in countries with life + 80 years

Spain has a copyright term of life + 80 years for creators that died before 1987. The list is sorted alphabetically and includes a notable work of the creator that entered the public domain on 1 January 2025.

Countries with life + 60 years
India

Entering the public domain in countries with life + 50 years

In most countries of Africa and Asia, as well as Belarus, Bolivia, New Zealand, Egypt and Uruguay; a work enters the public domain 50 years after the creator's death.

Australia and Canada

In 2004 copyright in Australia changed from a "plus 50" law to a "plus 70" law, in line with the United States and the European Union. But the change was not made retroactive (unlike the 1995 change in the European Union which bought some e.g. British authors back into copyright, especially those who died from 1925 to 1944). Hence the work of an author who died before 1955 is normally in the public domain in Australia; but the copyright of authors was extended to 70 years after death for those who died in 1955 or later, and no more Australian authors will come out of copyright until 1 January 2026 (those who died in 1955).

Similarly, Canada amended its Copyright Act in 2022 from a "plus 50" law to a "plus 70" law, coming into force on December 30, 2022, but does not revive expired copyright. No more new Canadian authors will come out of copyright until 1 January 2043 (those who died in 1972).

Entering the public domain in the United States

Under the Copyright Term Extension Act, books published in 1929, films released in 1929, and other works published in 1929, will enter the public domain in 2025. Sound recordings that were published in 1924 will enter the public domain.

Unpublished works whose authors died in 1954 will enter the public domain.

Among the works that will enter public domain in 2025 is the first film of The Marx Brothers, The Cocoanuts, second Academy Award for Best Picture winner The Broadway Melody, Ernest Hemingway's novel A Farewell to Arms, René Magritte's painting The Treachery of Images, the first part of the 14th edition of Encyclopædia Britannica, and the first Silly Symphony cartoons.

See also
 1954 in literature and 1974 in literature for deaths of writers
 Public Domain Day
 Creative Commons

References

External links
 
 
Popular Books of 1929 at Goodreads

Public domain
Public domain